J3 Productions is a multidisciplinary design studio located in Irvine, California. It was founded in 1998 by principal and creative director Jonathan Lo. The studio offers lifestyle, fashion, decor, and retail services.

References

External links
 

Design companies established in 1998
Companies based in Irvine, California
1998 establishments in the United States
1998 establishments in California
Companies established in 1998